"Meri Mrs. Chanchala" is an Indian situation comedy that revolves around the character of Mrs. Chanchala, a well-off and frequently bored housewife. She fixates on items or fads that catch her fancy, and indulges her whims. As a result, she is a constant source of irritation and frustration for her husband, Srikant. Mrs. Chanchala selects a new interest and strives for proficiency in that interest no matter how unrealistic. She reliably fails in attaining her goals, even though she never fails to upset her husband.

Cast 
Kanwaljit Singh as Mr. Srikant
Sushmita Mukherjee as Mrs. Chanchala
Ram Sethi as Srikant's Elder Brother

DD Metro original programming
Indian comedy television series
2000 Indian television series debuts
2001 Indian television series endings